is an opera by Antonio Salieri: more specifically, it is a dramma eroicomico. The opera is in two acts and is set to a libretto by Giovanni de Gamerra.

Salieri mingled elements of comic opera and heroic opera to produce a work that was a popular success at the time of its first performance, also partly due to the grandiose staging that is called for.

Performance history

The opera was first performed at the Kärntnertortheater in Vienna on 14 October 1795, and staged 39 times in the Austrian capital between then and 1798. It was also given in Germany in translation.

Roles

Synopsis

Set in ancient Persia, three Kings, arriving variously on a camel, an elephant and a horse, vie for the honour of killing a monster and winning the hand of the Persian princess Palmira.

References

 John A. Rice: "Palmira, regina di Persia", Grove Music Online ed L. Macy (accessed 29 May 2007), grovemusic.com, subscription access.
 John A. Rice: "Palmira, regina di Persia"  in 'The New Grove Dictionary of Opera', ed. Stanley Sadie (London, 1992) 

1795 operas
Operas
Operas set in ancient Persia
Cultural depictions of Darius the Great
Operas based on real people
Operas by Antonio Salieri